Derren Nesbitt (born Derren Michael Horwitz; 19 June 1935) is a British actor. Nesbitt's film career began in the late 1950s, and he also appeared in many television series in the late 1960s into the 1970s. He is known for his role as Major von Hapen in the 1968 film Where Eagles Dare.

Acting career

Often playing villains on screen, Nesbitt's television appearances began in the 1950s, including roles in The Adventures of Sir Lancelot, The Invisible Man, Man of the World, Danger Man, The Prisoner, Doctor Who, UFO, The Saint and Special Branch.

He has also appeared in film roles such as a predatory blackmailer of gay men in Victim (1961), a murderous pimp in The Informers (1963), a slimy assassin in Nobody Runs Forever, and the suspicious Gestapo officer in Where Eagles Dare (1968). Nesbitt was keen to be as authentic as possible with his character in Where Eagles Dare. Whilst on location, he requested to meet a former member of the Gestapo to better understand how to play the character and to get the military regalia correct. He was injured on set whilst filming the scene in which his character is killed. The blood squib attached to Nesbitt exploded with such force that he was temporarily blinded, though he made a quick recovery.

In 2018, Nesbitt played the leading role, as a drag queen, in a British independent film, Tucked.

Personal life 
Nesbitt has been married four times and has five children.

In 1961, he married his first wife, the actress Anne Aubrey; the couple had a daughter the next year. On 25 January 1973, he was fined £250 when he pleaded guilty to two charges of assault occasioning actual bodily harm in October the previous year. He attacked her with a leather strap after she told him that she was having an affair with another man. He also bruised her by grabbing her clothing the next day when she refused to tell him details about her lover. She divorced him a few months later.

His third wife was an Australian beauty queen, and for a time he moved to her country where he taught theatre studies at the Northern Rivers Conservatorium of Arts in Lismore NSW. As of 2014, he lives in Worthing, West Sussex, with his fourth wife, Miranda.

Filmography

Film

Television

References

External links 

1935 births
Living people
English male film actors
English male television actors
English people convicted of assault
Violence against women in England
People convicted of domestic violence
Male actors from London
People from Worthing
Alumni of RADA
20th-century English male actors
21st-century English male actors